This is a demography of the population of Azerbaijan including population density, ethnicity, education level, health of the populace, economic status, religious affiliations and other aspects of the population.

Total population 

In thousands

Notes about table
 To see the effect of periodical events on the population period until 1950 is not given in decades.

9,047,000 (2010)

Vital statistics

Current vital statistics

Structure of the population 

Structure of the population (01.01.2021) (Estimates):

Fertility rate (The Demographic Health Survey)
Fertility Rate (TFR) (Wanted Fertility Rate) and CBR (Crude Birth Rate):

Geographical differences  
As of 2020, Azerbaijan has a crude birth rate of 12.7‰. Rural areas tend to have higher birth rates compared to urban areas.

Life expectancy 

Source: UN World Population Prospects

Ethnic groups

Demographic statistics

Languages
Azerbaijani (official) 92.5%
Russian 1.4%
Armenian 1.4%
Other 4.7%

Ethnic groups
Azerbaijanis 85%
Talysh 5.0%
Lezgins 3.0%
Russians 1.5%,
Armenians 1.3%
Other 4.2%

Age structure
0-14 years: 22.3% (male 1,208,400/female 1,052,400)
15-24 years: 13% (male 695,800/female 619,100)
25-54 years: 45.4% (male 2,270,800/female 2,328,000)
55-64 years: 11.7% (male 555,900/female 632,300)
65 years and over: 7.5% (male 322,900/female 433,500) (2021 est.)

Median age
Total: 32.6 years
Male: 31.1 years
Female: 34.2 years (2020 est.)

Urbanization
 Urban population:5.554.445 people. This is 55.5% of total population (2019)
 Rate of urbanization: 1.64% of annual rate of change (2010-15 est.)

Sex ratio

At birth: 1.12 male(s)/female
0-14 years: 1.16 male(s)/female
15-24 years: 1.09 male(s)/female
25-54 years: 0.99 male(s)/female
55-64 years: 0.98 male(s)/female
65 years and over: 0.64 male(s)/female
Total population: 0.996 male(s)/female (2021 est.)

Infant mortality rate
Total: 26.67 deaths/1,000 live births
Country comparison to the world: 69
Male: 27.47 deaths/1,000 live births
Female: 25.76 deaths/1,000 live births (2014 est.)

Life expectancy at birth
Total population: 71.91 years
Country comparison to the world: 141
Male: 68.92 years
Female: 75.26 years (2014 est.)

Total fertility rate
2.04 children born/woman (2009 est.)
1.92 children born/woman (2012 est.)
1.91 children born/woman (2014 est.)
Country comparison to the world: 138

HIV/AIDS
Adult prevalence rate: less than 0.2% (2012 est.)
Country comparison to the world: 106
People living with HIV/AIDS: 10.400 (2012 est.)
Country comparison to the world: 102
Deaths: 65 (2012 est.)
Country comparison to the world: 85

Nationality
Noun: Azerbaijani(s)
Adjective: Azerbaijani

Religions
Islam 96.9% (approximately 60% Shia, 40% Sunni)
 Christian 3%
Other <0.1
Unaffiliated <0.1

Note: Religious affiliation is still nominal in Azerbaijan; percentages for actual practicing adherents are much lower.

Literacy
Definition: age 15 and over can read and write
Total population: 99.8%
Male: 99.9%
Female: 99.7% (2010 census)

Education expenditures
2.4% of total GDP (2011)
Country comparison to the world: 158

See also 
 Census in Azerbaijan

Notes

References

 
Society of Azerbaijan